Andre Agassi defeated the two-time defending champion Pete Sampras in the final, 3–6, 6–2, 7–6(7–3) to win the men's singles tennis title at the 1995 Miami Open. The final was a rematch of the Indian Wells final two weeks earlier, and Sampras was attempting to complete the Sunshine Double.

With the score tied 2–2 in the second set, Agassi found himself down 0–30 on his serve. He then won an amazing 17 points in a row en route to taking the second set, and ultimately the match.

Seeds

  Pete Sampras (final)
  Andre Agassi (champion)
  Michael Chang (third round)
  Alberto Berasategui (third round)
  Michael Stich (second round)
  Richard Krajicek (second round)
  Jim Courier (third round)
  Wayne Ferreira (quarterfinals)
  Todd Martin (second round)
  Andriy Medvedev (quarterfinals)
  Stefan Edberg (second round)
  Magnus Larsson (semifinals)
  Thomas Enqvist (fourth round)
  Patrick Rafter (second round)
  Jacco Eltingh (second round)
  Álex Corretja (second round)
  Jason Stoltenberg (second round)
  Bernd Karbacher (fourth round)
  Karel Nováček (second round)
  David Wheaton (third round)
  Carlos Costa (third round)
  Guy Forget (second round)
  Javier Sánchez (second round)
  Petr Korda (second round)
  Paul Haarhuis (second round)
  Mark Woodforde (fourth round)
  Aaron Krickstein (third round)
  Francisco Clavet (second round)
  Olivier Delaître (second round)
  Jaime Yzaga (quarterfinals)
  Jared Palmer (third round)
  Richard Fromberg (second round)

Draw

Finals

Top half

Section 1

Section 2

Section 3

Section 4

Bottom half

Section 5

Section 6

Section 7

Section 8

See also 
 Agassi–Sampras rivalry

External links
 Main draw

Men's Singles
1995 ATP Tour